Kadambari Jethwani (born 20 April 1996) is an UAE-based Indian entrepreneur, US-qualified medical doctor, HSC Board Exam Topper, internationally published medical author, former film actress, model, and beauty pageant title holder, who is known for her work in Hindi, Telugu, Kannada, Malayalam and Punjabi films, and her modeling campaigns.

Early life and background 
Jethwani was born into a Hindu Sindhi family. Her father, Narendrakumar Jethwani, is a Merchant navy officer and her mother, Asha Jethwani, is a manager with The Reserve Bank of India. Her maternal grandfather was a prominent social worker and social activist with Rashtriya Swayamsevak Sangh, who worked with Narendra Modi, when the careers of both of them were budding. She received her school education from Prakash Higher Secondary School, Mount Carmel High School and Udgam School in Ahmedabad. She started training in Bharatnatyam at the age of five and obtained Visharad (Bachelor of Arts) degree (on completion of seven years course) at twelve, from Gandharva Mahavidyalaya, New Delhi. She ranked fifth in the Gujarat Higher Secondary Examination. She played chess competitively during her school years and represented Gujarat at the National Chess Championships. As a kid, she also modelled regionally for brands such as Nippo batteries, Gayatri dairy and Maruti bread for the Gujarat market.

Career

Films
Jethwani relocated to Mumbai with her mother's job transfer to the city. There, a chance meeting with the director Muazzam Beg led to the lead role in Rajtaru Studios' Bollywood comedy-drama 'Sadda Adda'. The same year, she made her Malayalam debut with B. Unnikrishnan's thriller set in Bangkok, 'I Love Me', alongside Asif Ali and Anoop Menon. 2013 saw her starting the shoot for her Tamil debut as the heroine opposite Vinay Rai for Senthatti Kaalai Sevatha Kaalai directed by Saran, and the lead in Dharmesh Darshan's Punjabi film opposite Karan Kundra, but both the projects were shelved then. Due to conflicting schedules, she had walked out of Girish Malik's Jal opposite Purab Kohli, and Rajesh Pillai's Traffic opposite Parambrata Chatterjee. Next, she debuted in Kannada with Rajkumar Reddy's SIIMA-nominated supernatural horror film 'Ouija' produced by Vega Entertainment, and in Telugu with Aata. Ouija ran successfully for more than 100 days in theaters.

Modelling work

Jethwani has won Femina Miss India Gujarat, Femina Cover Girl, Miss Gujarat University, and Miss Ahmedabad Times titles.

She has been the face of nationwide advertisement campaigns for Videocon d2h, Cygnus jewellery, Mahindra Xylo, Shoppers Stop, Rahna homes, Vespa, Pond's White Beauty BB+ Fairness cream, Coloressence cosmetics, Integym and Jashn sarees among other brands, and featured on the cover pages of Femina (India) and LSF magazine, on Femina calendar, and in Cosmopolitan (India), Vogue (India) and Filmfare, among others. She has also had a stint on the runway, at India Runway Week, numerous Femina Showcases, and for Indian fashion and jewellery designers like Babita Malkani, Varuna D Jani, etc. and featured in Punjabi Music videos.

Publications
Jethwani, in affiliation with Drexel University, Philadelphia, Pennsylvania has co-authored medical articles published in Journal of Community Hospital Internal Medicine Perspectives and Cureus.

As a physician

After her first 2 movies, Jethwani pursued her medical degree and earned her M.B.B.S. from Smt. NHL Municipal Medical College in Ahmedabad, on full scholarship, and with distinction level marks throughout, and a gold medal in physiology. 
She was enrolled in Post-Graduate Program (PGP) at Indian School of Business(ISB), before doing a summer management program from Stanford University: Summer Institute for General Management, on full scholarship, having scored a 730/800 (96 percentile) on the GMAT. She is 
trained with a three-year residency and American Board certification in internal medicine from Drexel University College of Medicine, Philadelphia, Pennsylvania, with a 96 percentile on the United States Medical Licensing Examination. 

Jethwani is also an Aesthetic Doctor, having completed courses from The American Academy of Aesthetic Medicine.

Entrepreneurship
In the recent years, Jethwani has taken on the roles of Director of Billion Bricks Dubai (BLB), a multiple-award winning Real estate firm, and Tesoro Entertainment LLP(media production company), Mumbai.

Filmography

Awards and achievements
 Winner: Open Gujarat state under-14 Girls' Rapid Chess tournament – represented the state at the National tournament
 5th rank in Gujarat state – 1st rank among girls – Higher Secondary Examination
 Winner: Femina Miss India Gujarat, Miss Gujarat University, Miss Ahmedabad Times
 Winner: Ponds Femina cover girl contest (Face of Radiance), subtitles: Jashn Indian Beauty, Fresh Face, Best body

References

External links 
 
 Kadambari Jethwani on Facebook

Living people
Sindhi people
Gujarat University alumni
Actresses from Mumbai
Indian film actresses
Female models from Gujarat
21st-century Indian actresses
Actresses from Ahmedabad
Indian Hindus
1993 births